Catuna sikorana is a butterfly in the family Nymphalidae. It is found in eastern Tanzania and northern Malawi. The habitat consists of lowland forests.

The larvae possibly feed on Melianthaceae species.

References

Butterflies described in 1889
Limenitidinae
Butterflies of Africa